The 1967 NCAA Indoor Track and Field Championships were contested March 10−11, 1967 at the Cobo Arena in Detroit, Michigan at the third annual NCAA-sanctioned track meet to determine the individual and team national champions of men's collegiate indoor track and field events in the United States.

USC topped the team standings, finishing nine points ahead of Oklahoma. It was the Trojans' first indoor team title.

Qualification
Unlike other NCAA-sponsored sports, there were not separate University Divisions.

Team standings 
 Note: Top 10 only
 Full results

References

NCAA Indoor Track and Field Championships
Ncaa Indoor Track And Field Championships
Ncaa Indoor Track And Field Championships
NCAA Indoor Track and Field Championships